South Korea women's national floorball team is the national team of South Korea. At the 2013 Floorball Women's World Championship in Brno and Ostrava, Czech Republic, the team finished sixteenth.

References 

Women's national floorball teams
Floorball